Megateg is a genus of spiders in the family Zoropsidae. It was first described in 2005 by Raven & Stumkat. , it contains 8 species, all from Queensland.

Species
Megateg comprises the following species:
Megateg bartholomai Raven & Stumkat, 2005
Megateg covacevichae Raven & Stumkat, 2005
Megateg elegans Raven & Stumkat, 2005
Megateg gigasep Raven & Stumkat, 2005
Megateg lesbiae Raven & Stumkat, 2005
Megateg paulstumkati Raven & Stumkat, 2005
Megateg ramboldi Raven & Stumkat, 2005
Megateg spurgeon Raven & Stumkat, 2005

References

Zoropsidae
Araneomorphae genera
Spiders of Australia